Callulops doriae is a species of frog in the family Microhylidae. It is endemic to Papua New Guinea and occurs in the eastern mainland Papua New Guinea and in Tagula Island, Louisiade Archipelago. It is the type species of the genus Callulops erected by George Albert Boulenger in 1888. Common name Doria's callulops frog has been coined for this species.

Etymology
The specific name doriae honours Giacomo Doria, an Italian zoologist.

Description
Callulops doriae are relatively large frogs that can reach  in snout–vent length. The dorsal surfaces are verrucous, light brown, and have numerous blackish spots, each bearing a central white cap.

Habitat and conservation
Males call from low trees and rock crevices. Development is probably direct, without a free-living larval stage.

Callulops doriae is a widespread but uncommon species. No major threats to it have been identified. It occurs in a few protected areas.

References

doriae
Amphibians of Papua New Guinea
Endemic fauna of Papua New Guinea
Amphibians described in 1888
Taxa named by George Albert Boulenger
Taxonomy articles created by Polbot